Conus troendlei is a species of sea snail, a marine gastropod mollusc in the family Conidae, the cone snails and their allies.

Like all species within the genus Conus, these snails are predatory and venomous. They are capable of "stinging" humans, therefore live ones should be handled carefully or not at all.

Description
The size of the shell attains 17 mm.

Distribution
This species occurs in the Pacific Ocean off the Marquesas.

References

 Moolenbeek R.G., Zandbergen A. & Bouchet P. (2008) Conus (Gastropoda, Conidae) from the Marquesas Archipelago: description of a new endemic offshore fauna. Vita Malacologica 6: 19–34.

External links
 The Conus Biodiversity website
 

troendlei
Gastropods described in 2008